Ostashevskaya is a rural locality (a village) in Verkhovskoye Rural Settlement, Tarnogsky District, Vologda Oblast, Russia. The population was 12 as of 2002.

Geography 
Ostashevskaya is located 42 km west of Tarnogsky Gorodok (the district's administrative centre) by road. Anosovskaya is the nearest rural locality.

References 

Rural localities in Tarnogsky District